The Civil Constitution of the Clergy was a law passed on 12 July 1790 during the French Revolution, that caused the immediate subordination of most of the Catholic Church in France to the French government. As such, a schism was created, resulting in a small remnant French Catholic Church loyal to the Papacy, and a much larger "constitutional church" subject to the French state. The schism was not fully resolved until 1801.

Earlier legislation had already arranged the confiscation of the Catholic Church's French land holdings and banned monastic vows. This new law completed the destruction of the monastic orders, outlawing "all regular and secular chapters for either sex, abbacies and priorships, both regular and in commendam, for either sex". It also sought to settle the chaos caused by the earlier confiscation of Church lands and the abolition of the tithe. Additionally, the Civil Constitution of the Clergy regulated the current dioceses so that they could become more uniform and aligned with the administrative districts that had recently been created. It emphasised that officials of the church could not provide commitment to anything outside France, specifically the papacy (due to the great power and influence it wielded). Lastly, the Civil Constitution of the Clergy made bishops and priests elected. By having members of the clergy elected, the church lost much of the authority it had to govern itself and was now subject to the people, since they would vote on the priest and bishops as opposed to these individuals being appointed by the church and the hierarchy within.

The Civil Constitution of the Clergy was passed and some of the support for this came from figures that were within the Church, such as the priest and parliamentarian Pierre Claude François Daunou, and, above all, the revolutionary priest Henri Grégoire, who was the first French Catholic priest to take the Obligatory Oath. King Louis XVI ultimately yielded to the measure after originally opposing it.

Document outline 

The Civil Constitution of the Clergy has four titles with different articles.
 The document begins with an introduction on why the document was written.
 Title I focuses on the dioceses and how they were to be administered.
 Title II focuses on the administration of the dioceses and how elections were to take place.
 Title III focuses on payment because the Clergy was a salaried employee of the State.
 Title IV focuses on the living requirements for bishops, parish priests, and the curates.

Status of the Church in France before the Civil Constitution
Even before the Revolution and the Civil Constitution of the Clergy, the Catholic Church in France (the Gallican Church) had a status that tended to subordinate the Church to the State. Under the Declaration of the Clergy of France (1682) privileges of the French monarch included the right to assemble church councils in their dominions and to make laws and regulations touching ecclesiastical matters of the Church or to have recourse to the "appeal as from an abuse" ("appel comme d'abus") against acts of the ecclesiastical power.

Even prior to the Civil Constitution of the Clergy:
 On 11 August 1789 tithes were abolished.
 On 2 November 1789, Catholic Church property that was held for purposes of church revenue was nationalized, and was used as the backing for the assignats.
 On 13 February 1790, monastic vows were forbidden and all ecclesiastical orders and congregations were dissolved, excepting those devoted to teaching children and nursing the sick.
 On 19 April 1790, administration of all remaining church property was transferred to the State.

Motivation of the Civil Constitution
The following interlinked factors appear to have been the causes of agitation for the confiscation of church lands and for the adoption of the Civil Constitution of the Clergy:
 The French government in 1790 was nearly bankrupt; this fiscal crisis had been the original reason for the king's calling the Estates General in 1789.
 The Church owned about six percent of the land in France.  In addition the Church collected tithes.
 The Church used the six percent of the land they owned for a multitude of purposes which included churches, monasteries, convents, schools, hospitals, and other establishments which served the people of France.
 Owing, in part, to abuses of this system (especially for patronage), there was enormous resentment of the Church, taking the various forms of atheism, anticlericalism, and anti-Catholicism.
 Many of the revolutionaries viewed the Catholic Church as a retrograde force.
 At the same time, there was enough support for a basically Catholic form of Christianity that some means had to be found to fund the Church in France.

Debate over the Civil Constitution
On 6 February 1790, one week before banning monastic vows, the National Constituent Assembly asked its ecclesiastical committee to prepare the reorganization of the clergy. No doubt, those who hoped to reach a solution amenable to the papacy were discouraged by the consistorial address of March 22 in which Pius VI spoke out against measures already passed by the Assembly; also, the election of the Protestant Jean-Paul Rabaut Saint-Étienne to the presidency of the Assembly brought about "commotions" at Toulouse and Nîmes, suggesting that at least some Catholics would accept nothing less than a return to the ancien régime practice under which only Catholics could hold office.

The Civil Constitution of the Clergy came before the Assembly on 29 May 1790. François de Bonal, Bishop of Clermont, and some members of the Right requested that the project should be submitted to a national council or to the Pope, but did not carry the day. Joining them in their opposition to the legislation was Abbé Sieyès, one of the chief political theorists of the French Revolution and author of the 1789 pamphlet "What Is the Third Estate?"

Conversely, the Jansenist theologian Armand-Gaston Camus argued that the plan was in perfect harmony with the New Testament and the councils of the fourth century.

The Assembly passed the Civil Constitution on 12 July 1790, two days before the anniversary of the storming of the Bastille. On that anniversary, the Fête de la Fédération, Talleyrand and three hundred priests officiated at the "altar of the nation" erected on the Champ de Mars, wearing tricolor waistbands over their priestly vestments and calling down God's blessing upon the Revolution.

In 1793, the War in the Vendée was influenced by the Constitution passing due to the devout population toward the Church among other social factors.

Legal status of the Church in France under the Civil Constitution

As noted above, even prior to the Civil Constitution of the Clergy, church property was nationalized and monastic vows were forbidden. Under the Civil Constitution of the Clergy:
 There were 83 bishops, one per department, rather than the previous 135 bishops.
 Bishops (known as constitutional bishops) and priests were elected locally; electors had to sign a loyalty oath to the constitution. There was no requirement that the electors be Catholics, creating the ironic situation that Protestants and even Jews could help elect the Catholic priests and bishops. Their proportion in the French population was however very small.
 Authority of the Pope over the appointment of clergy was reduced to the right to be informed of election results.

The tone of the Civil Constitution can be gleaned from Title II, Article XXI:

Before the ceremony of consecration begins, the bishop elect shall take a solemn oath, in the presence of the municipal officers, of the people, and of the clergy, to guard with care the faithful of his diocese who are confided to him, to be loyal to the nation, the law, and the king, and to support with all his power the constitution decreed by the National Assembly and accepted by the king.

In short, new bishops were required to swear loyalty to the State in far stronger terms than to any religious doctrine. Even in this revolutionary legislation, there are strong remnants of Gallican royalism.

The law also included some reforms supported even by many within the Church. For example, Title IV, Article I states, "The law requiring the residence of ecclesiastics in the districts under their charge shall be strictly observed. All vested with an ecclesiastical office or function shall be subject to this, without distinction or exception." In effect, this banned the practice by which younger sons of noble families would be appointed to a bishopric or other high church position and live off its revenues without ever moving to the region in question and taking up the duties of the office. The abuse of bishoprics by the nobility was further reduced in Title II, Article XI: "Bishoprics and cures shall be looked upon as vacant until those elected to fill them shall have taken
the oath above mentioned." This unified state control over both the nobility and the Church through the use of elected bishops and the oath of loyalty.

Delay in implementation

For some time, Louis XVI delayed signing the Civil Constitution, saying that he needed "official word from Rome" before doing so. Pope Pius VI broke the logjam on 9 July 1790, writing a letter to Louis rejecting the arrangement. On 28 July, 6 September, and 16 December 1790, Louis XVI wrote letters to Pius VI, complaining that the National Assembly was forcing him to publicly accept the Civil Constitution, and suggesting that Pius VI appease them by accepting a few selected articles too. On 10 July, Pius VI wrote to Louis XVI, indicating to the king that the Church could not accept any of the provisions of the Constitution. The Constitution attempted to change the internal government of the Church, and no political regime had the right to unilaterally change the internal structure of the Church. On 17 August, Pius VI wrote to Louis XVI of his intent to consult with the cardinals about this, but on 10 October Cardinal Rochefoucauld, the Archbishop of Aix, and 30 of France's 131 bishops sent their negative evaluation of the main points of the Civil Constitution to the Pope. Only four bishops actively dissented. On 30 October, the same 30 bishops restated their view to the public, signing a document known as the Exposition of Principles ("Exposition des principes sur la constitution civile du clergé"), written by Jean de Dieu-Raymond de Cucé de Boisgelin

On 27 November 1790, still lacking the king's signature on the law of the Civil Constitution, the National Assembly voted to require the clergy to sign an oath of loyalty to the Constitution. During the debate on that matter, on 25 November, Cardinal de Lomenie wrote a letter claiming that the clergy could be excused from taking the Oath if they lacked mental assent; that stance was to be rejected by the Pope on 23 February 1791. On 26 December 1790, Louis XVI finally granted his public assent to the Civil Constitution, allowing the process of administering the oaths to proceed in January and February 1791.

Pope Pius VI's 23 February rejection of Cardinal de Lomenie's position of withholding "mental assent" guaranteed that this would become a schism. The Pope's subsequent condemnation of the revolutionary regime and repudiation of all clergy who had complied with the oath completed the schism.

Obligatory oath 

Within the Civil Constitution of the Clergy there was a clause that required the Clergy to take an oath stating the individual's allegiance to France. The oath was basically an oath of fidelity and it required every single priest in France to make a public choice on whether or not they believed the nation of France had authority over all religious matters. This oath was very controversial because many Clergy believed that they could not put their loyalty towards France before their loyalty towards God. If a clergyman were to refuse to take this oath of allegiance then they were challenging the Civil Constitution of the Clergy and challenging the validity of the assembly which had established the Civil Constitution of the Clergy. On 16 January 1791 approximately 50% of the individuals required to take the oath went ahead and took it and the other half decided to wait for Pope Pius VI to provide instruction, since he was indecisive on what the Oath signified and how the Clergy should respond to it. It is important to note that only seven bishops in all of France took the oath. In March 1791 Pope Pius VI finally decided that the oath was against the beliefs of the Church. By deciding that it was against the beliefs two groups were formed "jurors" and "non-jurors" ("refractory priests") and that was based on whether or not they had decided to take the oath. The Pope condemned those who took the oath and went as far as saying that they were absolutely separated from the church. Additionally, the Pope expressed disapproval and chastised King Louis XVI for signing the document that required the oath to be taken. Since the Pope expressed disapproval those who did not take it stayed unwilling to take it and as a result were replaced by those who had taken it. In addition to not receiving support from approximately 50% of the Clergy the oath was also disliked by a part of France's population. The individuals in France who were opposed to it claimed that the Revolution was destroying their "true" faith and this was also seen in the two groups of individuals that were formed because of the oath. Those who believed that the Revolution was causing their "true" faith to be destroyed sided with the "non-jurors" and those who believed that the French government should have a say in religion sided with the "jurors."

American Scholar Timothy Tackett believes that the oath that was required determined which individuals would let the revolution cause change and allow revolutionary reform and those who did not would remain true to their beliefs for many years to come. Apart from Tackett's beliefs, it can be said that the obligatory oath marked a key historical point in the French Revolution since it was the first piece of legislation in the revolution that received massive drawback and resistance.

Jurors and non-jurors

As noted above, the government required all clergy to swear an oath of loyalty to the Civil Constitution of the Clergy. Only seven bishops and about half of the clergy agreed while the rest refused; the latter became known as "non-jurors" or "refractory priests." In areas where a majority had taken the oath, such as Paris, the refractory minority could be victimized by society at large: nuns from the Hôtel-Dieu de Paris, for example, were subjected to humiliating public spankings.

While there was a higher rate of rejection in urban areas, most of these refractory priests (like most of the population) lived in the countryside, and the Civil Constitution generated considerable resentment among religious peasants. Meanwhile, the Pope repudiated the "jurors" who had signed the oath, especially bishops who had ordained new, elected clergy, and above all Bishop Louis-Alexandre Expilly de la Poipe. In May 1791, France recalled its ambassador to the Vatican and the Papal Nuncio was recalled from Paris. On June 9, the Assembly forbade the publication of Papal Bulls or Decrees, unless they had been approved by the Assembly as well.

The Constituent Assembly went back and forth on the exact status of non-juring priests. On 5 February 1791, non-juring priests were banned from preaching in public. By not allowing the clergy to preach the National Assembly was trying to silence the Clergy. This punishment that was imposed by the assembly signified that all refractory priest could no longer practice marriages and baptisms which were public ceremonies. By not allowing refractory clergy to practice these large public ceremonies they were silenced. However, non-juring clergy continued to celebrate the Mass and attract crowds because the Assembly feared that stripping them of all of their powers would create chaos and that would be ineffective towards silencing them. Although the Assembly allowed them to continue working in ceremonies that were not public they stated that they could only do so until they had been replaced by a clergyman who had taken the oath (juring). A large percentage of the refractionary priests were not replaced until 10 August 1792, which was more than a year after the original 50% had taken the oath; by the time they began to be replaced the Assembly had made some changes and it was not as significant that they were practicing Mass.

At the beginning, when the Assembly was stripping the clergy of their titles they tried to ignore how the extreme anti-clerical elements were responding with violence against those who attended these Masses and against nuns who would not renounce their vocation. Ultimately the Assembly had to recognize the schism that was occurring because it was extremely evident, even while the replacement was occurring juror priests often faced a hostile and violent reception in their old parishes. On 7 May 1791, the Assembly reversed itself, deciding that the non-juring priests, referred to as prêtres habitués ("habitual priests") could say Mass and conduct services in other churches on condition that they would respect the laws and not stir up revolt against the Civil Constitution. The assembly had to allow this change to control the schism and in part because "Constitutional Clergy" (those who had taken the oath) were unable to properly conduct their service. The constitutional clergy often required the assistance of the National Guard due to the mayhem that would occur.

The division in France was at an all-time high when even families had different views on juring and non-juring priest. The difference in families was primarily seen when the women would attend Masses that were held by those who had defied the oath and men attended Mass that was provided by clergymembers who had taken the oath. It is important to note that even though priests who had not taken the Oath had the right to use the churches many were not allowed to use the buildings (this was done by priest who had sworn their allegiance) this furthermore demonstrated the division in the state. On 29 November 1791, the Legislative Assembly, which had replaced the National Constituent Assembly, decreed that refractory priests could only exacerbate factionalism and aggravate extremists in the constituent assembly. The November 29th decree declared that no refractory priest could invoke the rights in the Constitution of the Clergy and that all such priests were suspect and so to be arrested. Louis XVI vetoed this decree (as he also did with another text concerning the creation of an army of 20,000 men on the orders of the Assembly, precipitating the monarchy's fall), which was toughened and re-issued a year later.

The Holy September Martyrs, or Blessed Martyrs of Carmes (Bienheureux Martyrs des Carmes) are 191 Roman Catholics summarily killed at the Carmes Prison in the September Massacres of 1792, consisting of three bishops, 127 secular priests, 56 monks and nuns, and five lay people, overwhelmingly non-jurors. They were beatified by pope Pius XI in October 1926.

Persecution of Roman Catholics by the State would intensify into de-Christianization and propagation of the Cult of Reason and the Cult of the Supreme Being in 1793–1794. During this time countless non-juring priests were interned in chains on prison ships in French harbors where most died within a few months from the unhealthy conditions.

The juring priests weren't spared either. Although the Constitutional Church had been permitted to continue its work, the National Convention considered Catholicism in any form suspicious. Eight Constitutional bishops were executed on the guillotine, three of whom were men who had played important roles in the early stages of the Revolution: Fauchet, Lamourette, and Gobel. In 1793 Fauchet, disgusted by the Jacobin excesses, attached himself to the moderate party. He voted in the Convention with the Girondins, exerted himself to oppose the condemnation of Louis XVI, prohibited in his diocese the marriage of the clergy and expressed deep sorrow for the errors and scandals both of his political and ecclesiastical career. After the insurrection of 31 May – 2 June 1793, Fauchet was consigned to the Conciergerie. With the Girondin deputies he was brought before the Revolutionary Tribunal on 30 October, and was guillotined on the following day, after having administered the absolution to his friend Sillery.

Adrian Lamourette, Constitutional bishop of Lyon, had in like manner recoiled before the crimes of the revolutionaries. He protested with indignation against the September Massacres, and supported to the utmost of his power the revolt of Lyon against the National Convention. The subsequent triumph of the Jacobins was fatal to him. After the fall of the city, Joseph Fouché arrested Lamourette, personally stripped him of his vestments and rode him through town on a donkey with a mitre on its head and a Bible and crucifix tied to its tail, so the mob could spit at and kick him. At the end of this blasphemous procession the crucifix and the Bible were publicly burned, and the donkey was given to drink out of the sacred chalice. Lamourette was then sent to Paris to be tried. Three days afterwards he was summoned before the Revolutionary Tribunal and sentenced to death. Thereupon he humbly made the sign of the cross, retracted his oath to the Civil Constitution, and declared that he had been the author of all the speeches upon ecclesiastical affairs which Mirabeau had delivered in his own name in the Constituent Assembly. He was guillotined on January 10, 1794.

On 7 November 1793, Jean-Baptiste-Joseph Gobel, Constitutional bishop of Paris, was forced to abjure in front of a large audience at the National Convention. Three days later, on 10 November, the Cathedral of Notre-Dame was rededicated to the Cult of Reason. Despite his acceptance of the principles of the Revolution, Gobel was executed together with Chaumette, Grammont, and many others as a "conspirator against the Republic", on April 13, 1794.

A similar fate befell Louis-Alexandre Expilly, Constitutional bishop of Finistère, who had distinguished himself in the early stages of the Revolution. Having joined the so-called "federalists", he was condemned to death by the Revolutionary Tribunal of Brest, and executed, with other magistrates of that place, on June 21, 1794, only one month before the fall of Robespierre. He was the last person executed that day as he had been giving absolution to his fellows waiting at the scaffold. There would be no Bishop of Quimper/Cornouaille for the next four years.

Another prominent victim of the Revolution was the former Constitutional Bishop of the Yonne department Étienne Charles de Loménie de Brienne. On 15 November 1793, he had renounced the priesthood, but his past as a cardinal and bishop made him an object of suspicion to the then prominent revolutionaries. He was arrested at Sens on 18 February 1794, and that same night died in prison, whether from a stroke or by poison, some said by suicide.

Repeal of the Civil Constitution
After the Thermidorian Reaction, the Convention repealed the Civil Constitution of the Clergy; however, the schism between the civilly constituted French Church and the Papacy was only resolved when the Concordat of 1801 was agreed on. The Concordat was reached on July 15, 1801, and it was made widely known the following year, on Easter. It was an agreement executed by Napoleon Bonaparte and clerical and papal representatives from Rome and Paris, and determined the role and status of the Roman Catholic Church in France; moreover, it concluded the confiscations and church reforms that had been implemented over the course of the revolution. The agreement also gave the first consul (Napoleon) the authority and right to nominate bishops, redistribute the current parishes and bishoprics, and allowed for seminaries to be established. In an effort to please Pius VII it was agreed upon that suitable salaries would be provided for bishops and curés and he would condone the acquisition of church lands.

References

Sources

External links 
 Civil Constitution of the Clergy, complete text in English
 Response of Pope Pius VI to the Civil Constitution of the Clergy, 13 April 1791.

1790 in Christianity
1790 in law
1790 events of the French Revolution
History of Catholicism in France
Anti-Catholicism in France
Persecution of Catholics
Religion and the French Revolution
Church and state law
Religious oaths
Schisms from the Catholic Church